The Abdul-Aziz al-Samarrai Mosque is an Islamic mosque located in Fallujah, Iraq.

The mosque came to worldwide attention when Sunni militants inside the mosque directed small-arms and rocket fire at US Marines. US forces returned fire, when a Cobra helicopter fired a Hellfire missile at the base of the mosque's minaret and an F-16 intentionally dropped a bomb on the mosque. A US Marines brigadier general said the mosque would ordinarily have protection under the Geneva Convention, but added that the attacks from inside the building caused it to lose its status. It was initially claimed that forty rebels had been killed in the strike, but it was later stated that no bodies were actually found at the scene. Other sources claim as many as 50 were killed in the attack.

See also

 Islam in Iraq
 List of mosques in Iraq

References

Mosques in Iraq
Fallujah